Richard Barnes (born 9 July 1944 in Surrey, England) is a British singer who saw limited chart success in the early 1970s.
He has also worked as an actor.

Career
His professional music career started with The Quiet Five in 1964, where he played bass guitar and sang vocals. The group broke up around 1967. Barnes released a solo album on Philips Records in 1970, which was produced by Gerry Bron, and scored two chart hits in the UK Singles Chart that same year. His first hit, "Take to the Mountains" reached number 35 in May 1970, and "Go North" peaked at number 38 in November. Both hits were written by Tony Hazzard.

A compilation album was released in August 2007 by RPM Records, under the title of Take To The Mountains. It featured tracks recorded by Barnes between 1969 and 1974. The track listing was as follows:
 "Take to the Mountains" (Hazzard)
 "Woman, Woman" (Glaser, Payne)
 "Maria Elena" (Hazzard)
 "Take My Hand for a While" (Saint Marie)
 "Your Song" (John, Taupin)
 "The Way I Feel" (Hazzard)
 "High Flying Electric Bird" (Brown, Mullen)
 "London" (McKuen)
 "I Think I'm Getting Over You" (Cook, Greenaway)
 "Hard Headed Woman" (Stevens)
 "Mama" (Hazzard)
 "It's Getting Better" (Mann, Weil)
 "Homeward Bound" (Simon)
 "Live Till You Die" (Rhodes)
 "Maybe" (Nilsson)
 "Tomorrow Never Comes" (Ife, Wirtz)
 "Could We Start Again Please" (Lloyd Webber)
 "Coldwater Morning" (Diamond)
 "Wandering" (Taylor)
 "Go North" (Hazzard)

Acting work
Barnes played the disciple Peter in the original London production of Jesus Christ Superstar at the Palace Theatre in 1972. He has continued working as an actor in various TV and musical theatre roles, including in the BBC's Count Dracula (1977), Doctor Who: Nightmare of Eden (1979) and The Winds of War (1983).

Discography

Albums

Singles

References

External links
[ Richard Barnes], Allmusic
Richard Barnes, MusicBrainz
 

1944 births
Living people
British male singers
British bass guitarists
Male bass guitarists
Musicians from Surrey
British male actors
British male musical theatre actors